Kunstverein may refer to:

Germany
 , an art association, founded in 1986 in Aachen
 Kunstverein Arnsberg, an association for contemporary art in Arnsberg
 , an art association in Karlsruhe
 , an art society which operates the Kunsthalle Bremen in Bremen
 Frankfurter Kunstverein, an art museum in Frankfurt
 , a venue for contemporary art exhibitions in Hamburg
 , an art association in Hanover
 Kölnischer Kunstverein, a former art association in Cologne, that now refers to an art gallery of the same name
 Kunstverein München, an association for contemporary art founded in 1823 in Munich
 , an art association that operates the Kunsthalle Mannheim in Mannheim
 Kunstverein Nürnberg, a venue for contemporary art exhibitions in Nuremberg
 Württembergischer Kunstverein Stuttgart, one of the biggest and oldest art societies in Germany located in Stuttgart

Switzerland
 Kunstverein Winterthur, an art society that operates the Kunstmuseum Winterthur in Winterthur
 Verein Kunsthalle Zürich, an art society that operates the Kunsthalle Zürich in Zürich

See also
 Kunstmuseum (disambiguation)
 Kunsthalle